Gary Montez Thurman (born November 12, 1964) is an American former professional baseball outfielder. He played for nine seasons in Major League Baseball (MLB) for the Kansas City Royals, Detroit Tigers, Seattle Mariners, and New York Mets. He was drafted by the Royals in the first round (21st pick) of the 1983 amateur draft. Thurman played his first professional season with their rookie-league Gulf Coast Royals in 1983, and his last with the Los Angeles Angels of Anaheim's Triple-A affiliate, the Vancouver Canadians, in 1998.

After his playing career, Thurman held various coaching and instructional roles. In 2007, he served as first base coach for the Mariners for the second-half of the season. He was the coordinator of baserunning for the Cleveland Indians during 2008–2011. He was the first base coach for the Miami Marlins for the 2012 season. He was the outfield and baserunning coordinator for the Washington Nationals for the 2017 season.

References

External links
Career statistics and player information from The Baseball Cube, or Baseball Reference, or Baseball Reference (Minors), or Retrosheet, or Venezuelan Professional Baseball League

1964 births
Living people
African-American baseball players
American expatriate baseball players in Canada
Baseball coaches from Indiana
Baseball players from Indianapolis
Charleston Royals players
Detroit Tigers players
Fort Myers Royals players
Gulf Coast Royals players
Kansas City Royals players
Leones del Caracas players
Major League Baseball outfielders
Memphis Chicks players
Miami Marlins coaches
Minor league baseball managers
Nashville Sounds players
New York Mets players
Newark Bears players
Norfolk Tides players
Omaha Royals players
Ottawa Lynx players
Seattle Mariners players
Seattle Mariners coaches
Tacoma Rainiers players
Tiburones de La Guaira players
American expatriate baseball players in Venezuela
Vancouver Canadians players
21st-century African-American people
20th-century African-American sportspeople